The Dutch Eerste Divisie in the 1981–82 season was contested by 18 teams, one less than in the previous season. This was due to the bankruptcy of FC Vlaardingen. Helmond Sport won the championship.

From this season onwards, instead of two, three teams would promote to the eredivisie. Two were promoted directly and one through a promotion competition which was organized the same as in previous seasons.

New entrants
Relegated from the 1980–81 Eredivisie
 SBV Excelsior
 FC Wageningen

League standings

Promotion competition
In the promotion competition, four period winners (the best teams during each of the four quarters of the regular competition) played for promotion to the Eredivisie.

See also
 1981–82 Eredivisie
 1981–82 KNVB Cup

References
Netherlands - List of final tables (RSSSF)

Eerste Divisie seasons
2
Neth